This page is a list of notable people connected to King's University College at the University of Western Ontario.

Notable alumni

Politics and government
Vince Agro - former Mayor of Hamilton, Ontario, Giller Prize nominated author (BA 1962)
Joe Ceci - Member of the Legislative Assembly of Alberta, Albertan Minister of Finance (BA 1980)
Sheila Copps - former Deputy Prime Minister of Canada, Officer of the Order of Canada (BA 1974)
Ed Corrigan - former London Ontario city councillor (BA 1977)
John Cummins - former Member of Parliament, past leader of the British Columbia Conservative Party (BA 1966)
Amir Farahi - Executive Director of the London Institute; political commentator (BA 2013)
Peter Fragiskatos - Member of Parliament (BA 2004)
Pat O'Brien - former Member of Parliament (BA 1971)
Jake Skinner - London, Ontario School Board Trustee (BA)
Karen Stintz - Toronto mayoral candidate (BA 1992)
Sandy White - former London Ontario city councillor (BSW 1991, MSW 2008)

Sports, athletics
Sandy Annunziata - Grey Cup-winning football player, former Fort Erie City Councillor (began degree in 1988, completed BA degree in 2004)
Craig Butler - Canadian Football League player (BA 2013)
Rory Connop - Canadian Football League player (BA 2015)
Cody Deaner, real name Chris Grey - professional wrestler (BA 2005)
Matt Dzieduszycki professional hockey player (attended 2002)
David Lee - Grey Cup winning football defensive end (BA 2012)
Vaughn Martin - NFL football player (attended 2009, did not graduate)
Danny Syvret - NHL hockey player (attended 2004, did not graduate)

Arts and journalism
Mary Intven-Wallace - children's author (BA 1973)
Juggan Kazim, real name Mehr Bano - Pakistani-Canadian actress and television host
John Melady - Canadian non-fiction author (BA 1962)
Anne Marie Owens - editor of The National Post newspaper (BA 1986)
Jennifer Robson - historical fiction author (BA 1992)
Ed Struzik - Michener Award-winning journalist and novelist (BA 1977)

Religion and law enforcement

Archbishop of Toronto Thomas Cardinal Collins (Bachelor of Theology from St. Peters Seminary 1973)
Robert Anthony Daniels - Bishop of Grand Falls, Newfoundland
Brian Joseph Dunn - Bishop of Antigonish, ex-officio Chancellor of St. Francis Xavier University (BA 1976, M.Div. 1979)
William Terrence McGrattan - Auxiliary Bishop for the Archdiocese of Toronto (M.Div. 1987 from St. Peter's Seminary)
Brent Shea - Deputy Chief of the London Ontario Police Department; Member of the Order of Merit of the Police Forces (BA 1980)

Notable faculty
Carol Hopkins - Professor of Social Work, Officer of the Order of Canada.
Laurier LaPierre - professor during the early 1960s; later appointed to the Senate of Canada
Dante Leonardon - 1990 Canadian Professor of the Year (now Professor Emeritus)
Paul Werstine FRSC- Shakespeare expert, co-editor of Folger Shakespeare Library editions

References

University of Western Ontario
 
Western Ontario
University of Western Ontario
King's University College at the University of Western Ontario